Dagobert Banzio (21 June 1957 – 26 August 2017) was an Ivorian politician, government minister, and member of the Democratic Party of Côte d'Ivoire – African Democratic Rally (PDCI-RDA). 

A member of the National Assembly, Banzio served as the Minister of Youth, Civil Education and Sports from December 2005 until 7 April 2007, within the government of Prime Minister Charles Konan Banny; Minister of Youth, Sports, and Recreation from April 2007 to 4 March 2010, with the first government of Prime Minister Guillaume Soro; Minister of Economic Infrastructure within Prime Minister Soro's second government from 4 March 2010 until 5 December 2010; Minister of Commerce with the administration of Prime Minister Jeannot Ahoussou-Kouadio from March 2012 to November 2012; and finally Minister of Youth, Sports and Urban Health for Prime Minister Soro's third government, which began in 2012.

Banzio was born in the western town of Tinhou, present-day Bloléquin Department, Ivory Coast, on 21 June 1957. He died in Paris, France, on 26 August 2017, at the age of 60 following a serious illness of several months.

References

1957 births
2017 deaths
Members of the National Assembly (Ivory Coast)
Democratic Party of Côte d'Ivoire – African Democratic Rally politicians
People from Montagnes District
Economy ministers of Ivory Coast
Education ministers of Ivory Coast
Finance ministers of Ivory Coast
Trade ministers of Ivory Coast
Youth ministers of Ivory Coast